Zeta Scuti, Latinized from ζ Scuti, is the Bayer designation for a star in the southern constellation of Scutum. It is a faint star but visible to the naked eye with an apparent magnitude of 4.66. The distance to this star, as determined via parallax measurement, is around 210 light years. It is moving closer to the Sun with a radial velocity of −5 km/s.

This is an astrometric binary system with a period of 6.5 years (2,374 days) and an orbital eccentricity of 0.10. The visible component is an aging giant star of type G with a stellar classification of G9 IIIb Fe−0.5. The suffix notation indicates the spectrum displays a mild underabundance of iron. It has 1.29 times the mass of the Sun and has expanded to 9.3 times the Sun's radius. The star is radiating 62 times the Sun's luminosity from its enlarged photosphere at an effective temperature of 4,750 K.

References

G-type giants
Astrometric binaries
Scuti, Zeta
Scutum (constellation)
BD-09 4712
169156
090135
6884
TIC objects